Enterprise systems engineering (ESE) is the discipline that applies systems engineering to the design of an enterprise.  As a discipline, it includes a body of knowledge, principles, and processes tailored to the design of enterprise systems. 

An enterprise is a complex, socio-technical system that comprises interdependent resources of people, information, and technology that must interact to fulfill a common mission.

Enterprise systems engineering incorporates all the tasks of traditional systems engineering but is further informed by an expansive view of the political, operational, economic, and technological (POET) contexts in which the system(s) under consideration are developed, acquired, modified, maintained, or disposed.

Enterprise systems engineering may be appropriate when the complexity of the enterprise exceeds the scope of the assumptions upon which textbook systems engineering are based. Traditional systems engineering assumptions include relatively stable and well understood requirements, a system configuration that can be controlled, and a small, easily discernible set of stakeholders.

An enterprise systems engineer must produce a different kind of analysis on the people, technology, and other components of the organization in order to see the whole enterprise. As the enterprise becomes more complex, with more parameters and people involved, it is important to integrate the system as much as possible to enable the organization to achieve a higher standard.

Elements 
Four elements are needed enterprise system engineering to work. These include development through adaption, strategic technical planning, enterprise governance, and ESE processes (with stages).

Development through adaptation 
Development through adaptation is a way to compromise with the problems and obstacles in complex systems. Over time the environment changes and adaptation is required to continue development. For example, the mobile phone has gone through many adaptations. When it was first released, its size was enormous, but over generations of development phones became smaller. The development of mobile data from 1G to 5G made using phones faster and more convenient.

Strategic technical planning 

Strategic technical planning (STP) gives the enterprise the picture of their aim and objectives. STP components are:
 Mission statement
 Needs assessment
 Technology descriptions and goal statement
 Hardware and software requirement
 Budget plan
 Human Resources

Enterprise governance 
Enterprise governance is defined as 'the set of responsibilities and practices exercised by the board and executive management to provide strategic direction, ensure that objectives are achieved, ascertain that risks are managed appropriately and verify that the organization's resources are used responsibly,' according to CIMA Official Terminology. EG allows one to make the right decision on the choice of CEO and executives for the company, and also to identify the risks of the company.

Processes 
Four steps comprise the enterprise system engineering process: technology planning (TP); capabilities-based engineering analysis (CBEA); enterprise architecture (EA); and enterprise analysis and assessment (EA&A).

Technology planning 
TP looks for technologies key to the enterprise. This step aims to identify the innovative ideas and choose the technologies that are useful for the enterprise.

Capabilities-based engineering analysis 
CBEA is an analysis method that focuses on elements that the whole enterprise needs.  The three steps are purpose formulation, exploratory analysis, and evolutionary planning:

Purpose formulation 
 Assess stakeholder Interest – understand what the stakeholders want and like
 Specify outcome spaces – find solutions for several conditions and the goal for the operations
 Frame capability portfolios - collect fundamental elements

Exploratory analysis 
 Assess performance and cost – identify the performance and cost in different conditions and find solutions to improve
 Explore concepts – search for new concepts and transform advanced capabilities
 Determine the need for more variety – examine the risks and chances and decide whether new ways are needed

Evolutionary planning 
 Assess enterprise impacts – investigate the effects on the enterprise in technical and capability aspects
 Examine evolution strategies – explore and construct more strategies and evolution route
 Develop capability road map – plan for the capability area which includes analysis and decision making which is a tool for assessment and development for the enterprise

Enterprise architecture 

EA is a model that illustrates the vision, network and framework of an organization. The four aspects (according to Michael Platt) are business prospects, application, information and technology. The diagram shows the structure of enterprise architecture. The benefits are improvement of decision making, increased IT efficiency and minimizes losses.
 Business – The strategies and process by the operation of business
 Application – Interaction and communication along with the process used in the company
 Information – The logical data and statistics that the organization required to run properly and actively
 Technology – The software and hardware and different operation systems that used in the company
All the elements are dependent and rely on each other in order to build the infrastructure.

Enterprise analysis and assessment 
Enterprise analysis and assessment aims to assess whether the enterprise is going in the right direction and help to make correct decisions. Qualities required for this step include awareness of technologies, knowing and understanding command and control (C2) issues, and using modeling and simulation (M&S) explore the implications.

Activities and actions for this event include:
 Multi-scale analysis
 Early and continuous war fighter operational assessment
 Lightweight, portable M&S-based C2 capability representations
 Development software available for assessment
 Minimal infrastructure
 Flexible M&S operator-in-the-loop (OITL), and hardware-in-the-loop (HWIL) capabilities
 In-line, continuous performance monitoring and selective forensics

Traditional systems engineering 
Traditional systems engineering (TSE) is a term to be defined as an engineering sub-system. Elements:
 TSE is conducted by an external designer
 It is a stable system which doesn't change automatically
 Operation and development are independent of each other
 People do not play an important role in it
 Massive machines have expected conduct
A survey compared ESE and TSE. The survey reported that the two are complementary and interdependent. ESE had a higher rating while TSE could be part of ESE. The combination could be ideal.

Applications 
The two types of ESE application are Information Enterprise Systems Engineering and Social Enterprise Systems Engineering.

Information Enterprise Systems Engineering (IESE) 
It is a system that builds up to meet the requirements and expectations of different stakeholders in the organization. There must be an input device to collect the information and output device to satisfy the information needs.

There are three different aspects for the framework of IESE:

 Functional view
 Topology view
 Physical view

Also, there are different rules for the IESE model.

 Interchangeable point of view
 Detailed views and well displayed. Showing the specific method, solution and techniques
 Consistent views
 Supported viewpoints

Social Enterprise System Engineering 
This is a framework that involves planning, analyzing, mapping, and drawing a network of the process for enterprises and stakeholders. Moreover, it creates social value for entrepreneurship and explores and focuses on social and societal issues. It forms a connection between social enterprise and system engineering. There is a Social Enterprise Systems Engineering V-model, in which two or more social elements are established based on the system engineering framework—for example, more social interface analysis that reviews stakeholders' requirements, and more activities and interactions between stakeholders to exchange opinion.

Opportunity and risk management 
There are opportunities and risks in ESE and they have to be aggressive in seeking opportunities and also finding ways to avoid or minimize the risks. Opportunity is a trigger element that may lead to the accomplishment of objectives. Risk is a potential occurrence and will affect the performance of the entire system.  There are several reasons for the importance of risk management.
 To identify the risks before head which can prepare actions to prevent or minimize the risks
 Since risks can cost the enterprise, determining the risk events can reduce the amount of loss
 Help to know how to allocate the human or technology resources in order avoid the most critical risks
There are few steps in Enterprise risk and opportunity Management Process
 Prepare the risk and opportunity plan – Select team and representatives
 Identify Risks – Complete risks statements for each risk
 Identify Opportunities – People that work at tactical level and manager must understand the opportunities in order to take a further action
 Evaluate the Enterprise Risks and Opportunities – To decide which is more critical and vital
 Develop the plan – Develop after identification and evaluation with different strategies

See also 
 Enterprise architecture
 Enterprise engineering
 Enterprise life cycle
 Industrial engineering
 Systems engineering
 Soft systems methodology
 System of systems
 System of systems engineering (SoSE)
 Risk management plan
 Technology roadmap

References

Further reading
 R.E. Giachetti, (2010), Design of Enterprise Systems, CRC Press, Boca Raton, Florida. 
 Oscar A. Saenz, and Chin-Sheng Chen (2004). "A Framework for Enterprise Systems Engineering"
 Robert S. Swarz, and Joseph K. DeRosa (2006). A Framework for Enterprise Systems Engineering Processes

External links
 Department of Industrial and Enterprise Systems Engineering University of Illinois at Urbana-Champaign.
 MIT Engineering Systems Division

Enterprise modelling
Systems engineering